A hyperparasite, also known as a metaparasite, is a parasite whose host, often an insect, is also a parasite, often specifically a parasitoid. Hyperparasites are found mainly among the wasp-waisted Apocrita within the Hymenoptera, and in two other insect orders, the Diptera (true flies) and Coleoptera (beetles). Seventeen families in Hymenoptera and a few species of Diptera and Coleoptera are hyperparasitic. Hyperparasitism developed from primary parasitism, which evolved in the Jurassic period in the Hymenoptera. Hyperparasitism intrigues entomologists because of its multidisciplinary relationship to evolution, ecology, behavior, biological control, taxonomy, and mathematical models.

Examples

The most common examples are insects that lay their eggs inside or near parasitoid larvae, which are themselves parasitizing the tissues of a host, again usually an insect larva.

A well-studied case is that of the small white butterfly (Pieris rapae), a serious horticultural pest of Brassica species such as cabbage and Brussels sprouts. Its larvae are parasitized by the larvae of the wasps Cotesia glomerata and C. rubecula, both of which are in turn parasitized by the wasp Lysibia nana.

Plant volatiles are emitted from plants as a defense against herbivory. The volatiles emitted attract parasitic wasps that in turn attack the herbivores. Hyperparasitoids are known to find their victims through herbivore-induced plant volatiles emitted in response to attack by caterpillars that in turn had been parasitized by primary parasitoids. The larvae of parasitic wasps developing inside the caterpillar alter the composition of the oral secretions of their herbivorous host and thereby affect the cocktail of volatiles the plant produces. The pupae of primary parasitoid species are parasitized by many hyperparasitoid species.

Hyperparasites are not limited to insects. There are parasitic flatworms that are parasite on crustaceans, themselves parasite on fish. An example is the monogenean Cyclocotyla bellones, found on Ceratothoa parallela, a cymothoid isopod parasite of the sparid fish Boops boops.

Number of levels

There are further levels of parasitoids, beyond secondary, especially among facultative parasitoids. Three levels of parasitism have been observed in fungi (specifically, a fungus on a fungus on a fungus on a tree).

Effect on prey

Hyperparasites can control their hosts' populations, and are used for this purpose in agriculture and to some extent in medicine. The controlling effects can be seen in the way that CHV1 virus helps to control the damage that chestnut blight, Cryphonectria parasitica, does to American chestnut trees, and in the way that bacteriophages can limit bacterial infections. It is likely, though little researched, that most parasitic (disease-causing) micro-organisms have hyperparasites which may prove widely useful in both agriculture and medicine.

Hyperparasitism is to an extent analogous to predation on herbivores, which in turn eat plants, as there are three trophic levels involved. However, hyperparasites are smaller than predators, breed more rapidly than their hosts and are generally found in larger numbers, while especially in the case of micro-organisms, their hosts can sometimes clear their infection. Hyperparasitism may thus behave differently from three-level predator-prey systems: predators can exert control of prey populations, for instance as keystone species, but given the differences between hyperparasites and predators, their effects may need to be modelled differently.

In literature

Jonathan Swift refers to hyperparasitism in these lines from his poem "On Poetry: A Rhapsody":

See also
Hyperparasitoid

Notes

References

Hyperparasites